Gabriel Vasquez (born August 3, 1984) is an American politician who is the U.S. representative for New Mexico's 2nd congressional district. He previously served as a member of the Las Cruces City Council. Vasquez is a member of the Democratic Party.

Early life and education 
Vasquez was born in El Paso, Texas, and raised in Ciudad Juárez, Mexico. He earned a Bachelor of Arts degree in English and journalism from New Mexico State University in 2008.

Career 
As a college student, Vasquez was the news editor and editor-in-chief of The Round Up, New Mexico State University's student-run newspaper. From 2008 to 2011, he was the business editor of the Las Cruces Bulletin. In 2011, he was the executive director of the Las Cruces Hispanic Chamber of Commerce. From 2013 to 2015, he served as a field representative for Senator Martin Heinrich.

In 2015 and 2016, Vasquez was the vice president of communications for First Focus, a Washington, D.C.-based advocacy organization. From 2016 to 2018, he was the director of community relations for the New Mexico Wildlife Federation. In 2018 and 2019, he was the deputy director of New Mexico's chapter of the Wilderness Society. From 2019 to 2021, he worked as deputy director of the Western Conservation Foundation in the federal lands department. From 2017 to 2021, he served as a member of the Las Cruces City Council.

U.S. House of Representatives

2022 election 
Vasquez was the Democratic nominee for New Mexico's 2nd congressional district in the 2022 election. He won on November 8, 2022, by a margin of about 1,300 votes, defeating Republican incumbent Yvette Herrell. The district's boundaries were redrawn after the 2020 census, making the previously Republican-leaning district more competitive.

During the campaign, Vasquez deleted tweets attacking the oil and gas industry, rationalizing rioting in the summer of 2020, and comparing the Trump administration to the Ku Klux Klan.

Tenure

Caucus memberships

 New Democrat Coalition
 Congressional Hispanic Caucus

Committee assignments 

 House Committee on Armed Services
 House Agriculture Committee

Political positions

COVID-19 policy 
On January 31, 2023, Vasquez voted against H.R.497:Freedom for Health Care Workers Act, which would lift COVID-19 vaccine mandates for healthcare workers.

On February 1, 2023, Vasquez voted against a resolution to end the COVID-19 national emergency.

Immigration 
On February 9, 2023, Vasquez voted against H.J.Res. 24: Disapproving the action of the District of Columbia Council in approving the Local Resident Voting Rights Amendment Act of 2022, which condemns the District of Columbia’s plan to allow illegal immigrants to vote in local elections.

Syria 
In 2023, Vasquez voted against H.Con.Res. 21, which would have ended U.S. troops' involvement in the American-led intervention in the Syrian civil war within 180 days.

Electoral history

2022

See also

List of Hispanic and Latino Americans in the United States Congress

References

External links
 Congressman Gabe Vasquez official U.S. House website
Gabe Vasquez for Congress 

|-

1984 births
21st-century American politicians
Democratic Party members of the United States House of Representatives from New Mexico
Hispanic and Latino American city council members
Hispanic and Latino American members of the United States Congress
Hispanic and Latino American people in New Mexico politics
Living people
New Mexico city council members
New Mexico Democrats
New Mexico State University alumni
Politicians from El Paso, Texas
Politicians from Las Cruces, New Mexico